Ólafur Karl Finsen (born 30 March 1992) is an Icelandic footballer, who currently plays for FH.

Club career

Ólafur started his career with local club Stjarnan in 2010.

International career

Ólafur made his first international appearance on 16 January 2015 in a match against Canada, when he came on as a substitute for Jón Daði Böðvarsson with about 20 minutes left of the match.

References

External links

1992 births
Living people
Olafur Karl Finsen
Olafur Karl Finsen
Olafur Karl Finsen
Sandnes Ulf players
Norwegian First Division players
Stjarnan players
Valur (men's football) players
Olafur Karl Finsen
Association football midfielders
Association football forwards